Richard Ernest Morgan (May 17, 1937 – November 13, 2014) was a conservative author, contributing editor of City Journal, and the William Nelson Cromwell Professor of Government at Bowdoin College in Brunswick, Maine, United States. His areas of academic interest included the history, law and politics of the First Amendment. At the time of his death, Morgan was one of the leading conservatives of his generation.

Works
Authored, co-authored or edited:
 The Politics of Religious Conflict
 The Supreme Court and Religion
 Domestic Intelligence: Monitoring Dissent in America
 American Politics: Direction of Change, Dynamics of Choice and People, Power and Politics
 Disabling America: The Rights Industry in Our Time

References

External links
 Official Bio
 Interview with the Bowdoin Orient
 2000 Madison Memorial Speech
 "Why Bakke Has No Case" by Ronald Dworkin
 "Coming Clean About Brown"
 "Limits to Diversity" 
 "Negating Affirmative Action", 1995
 First Things Symposium, "End of Democracy?"
 "Why the Founding is Back in Vogue"
 "First Things First", 1997
 Obituary

Bowdoin College alumni
Bowdoin College faculty
Columbia University alumni
Harvard University staff
1937 births
2014 deaths
People from Philipsburg, Centre County, Pennsylvania